Wakiso District is a district in the Central Region of Uganda that partly encircles Kampala, Uganda's capital city. The town of Wakiso is the site of the district headquarters.
Kira, the country's second largest city and suburb of Kampala, is in the district.

Location
Wakiso District lies in the Central Region of the country, bordering with Nakaseke District and Luweero District to the north, Mukono District to the east, Kalangala District in Lake Victoria to the south, Mpigi District to the southwest and Mityana District to the northwest. The coordinates of the district are:00 24N, 32 29E.

Demographics

In 1991, the national population census estimated the district population at 562,887. According to the 2002 national census figures, Wakiso District had a population of 907,988, making it the second-most populated district in the country. At that time, 53 percent of the population were children below the age of 18 years and 17 percent of the population were orphans. The national census and household survey of 2014 enumerated 1,997,418 people in the district. The Uganda Bureau of Statistics (UBOS), estimated he total population in the district, as of mid-year 2020 at 2,915,000. UBOS also calculated that the district population increased at an average annual rate of 6.7 percent, between 2014 and 2020.

Administrative units

Wakiso District is made up of two counties and a municipality: Kyadondo County, Busiro County. Eentebbe City was split off and granted city status in 2020. The district is further subdivided into the following administrative units:

 Busukuma
 Gombe
 Kakiri Town
 Katabi
 Kasanje
 Kira Town
 Ssabagabo
 Masuliita
 Nabweru
 Namayumba
 Nangabo (includes Gayaza and Kasangati)
 Nansana Town
 Nsangi
 Ssisa
 Wakiso Town

District leadership
The leadership is entrusted in the District Executive Council, composed of:
 District Chairman
 District Vice Chairman
 District Secretary for Finance
 District Secretary for Production & Natural Resources
 District Secretary for Works & Technical Services
 District secretary Gender
 Resident District Commissioner
 Deputy Resident District Commissioner

Tourist attractions
The tourist attractions in the district include:
 Buganda Cultural Sites and Kabaka's Palaces
 Old Entebbe Town
 Entebbe Botanical Gardens
 Uganda Wildlife Education Center (UWEC) - Entebbe
 Entebbe International Airport
 State House - Entebbe (the Official Residence of the President of Uganda)
 Ngamba Island Chimpanzee Sanctuary on Lake Victoria - Sanctuary for chimpanzees
 Bulago Resort Island
 Lake Victoria - the largest lake in Africa and the second largest fresh-water lake in the world
 Uganda Martyrs Basilica - Namugongo
 Mandela National Stadium - Namboole

See also
 Districts of Uganda
 Lake Victoria

References

External links
Wakiso District Profile at Ugandatravelguide.com
  Bulago Island Homepage 
  Ngamba Island Homepage
 Google Map of the Wakiso District

 
Districts of Uganda
Central Region, Uganda
Lake Victoria